The Department of the Environment, Sport and Territories (also called DEST) was an Australian government department that existed between March 1993 and October 1997.

Scope
Information about the department's functions and/or government funding allocation could be found in the Administrative Arrangements Orders, the annual Portfolio Budget Statements and in the Department's annual reports.

According to the Administrative Arrangements Order (AAO) made on 24 March 1993, the Department dealt with:
Sport and recreation
Environment and conservation
Meteorology
Administration of the Australian Capital Territory
Administration of the Jervis Bay Territory, the Territory of Cocos (Keeling) Islands, the Territory of Christmas Island, the Coral Sea Islands Territory, the Territory of Ashmore and Cartier Islands, and of Commonwealth responsibilities on Norfolk Island
Constitutional development of the Northern Territory of Australia

References

External links
  

Environment, Sport and Territories
Australia
1997 disestablishments in Australia
1993 establishments in Australia
Ministries established in 1993